Shgharshik is a village in the Syunik Province of Armenia, located on the outskirts of Kapan.

References 

Populated places in Syunik Province